ACHS may refer to:

American schools:
 Adolfo Camarillo High School, Camarillo, California
 Alexandria City High School, Alexandria, Virginia
 Allen Central High School, Eastern, Kentucky
 American Canyon High School, American Canyon, California
 Antioch Community High School, Antioch, Illinois
 Archbishop Carroll High School, Washington, D.C.
 Argo Community High School, Summit, Illinois
 Arlington Catholic High School, Arlington, Massachusetts
 Atlantic City High School, Atlantic City, New Jersey
 Almeta Crawford High School, Fort Bend County, Texas

Other uses:
 Association of College Honor Societies
 Asociación Chilena de Seguridad (Chilean Safety Association)

People

Surname
 Ken Achs, former Canadian drag racer